Der Spalt (The Gap - Mindcontrol) is a 2014 German feature film. The film was written and directed by Kim Schicklang. It was released on June 7, 2014. In 2015 the film won an international film prize in Jakarta.

Plot

The film is a drama which revolves around the isolation of a young transsexual called Alex. She is living together with her jobless mother in a dystopia. There is no hope for her. But Alex is getting in touch with Christian, a photo reporter. He is the first who recognized Alex as a woman. Together they try a revolution against sex and gender norming.

Cast
 Marie Fischer - Alex
 Folker Dücker - Christian
 Dorothea Baltzer - Mother
 Werner Braunschädel - Professor Bernhard
 Bernd Michael Straub - Frau Müller
 Trischa Dorner - The Face
 Yana Robin LaBaume - Lesbian

See also
 List of lesbian, gay, bisexual or transgender-related films
 Transgender in film and television

External links
 
 Der Spalt at Filmreihe homochrom
 Der Spalt at QUEERmdb

References

2014 films
German drama films
German LGBT-related films
2010s German-language films
Transgender-related films
LGBT-related drama films
2014 drama films
2014 directorial debut films
2014 LGBT-related films
2010s German films